Manis is a genus of pangolins.

Manis may also refer to:

 Manis (given name)
 Manis (surname)
 Manis (orangutan) (fl. 1978), film performer
 Manis Mastodon site
 Manis palaeojavanica, an extinct species of pangolin
 Apristurus manis (ghost catshark)
 Belimbing manis (Averrhoa carambola), a tree which produces starfruit in Indonesia and Malaysia

See also 
 Mannes School of Music
 Mannes, surnames and given names
 Manus (disambiguation)